Free Bop! is an album by saxophonist Charles McPherson which was recorded in 1978 and released on the Xanadu label.

Reception

The Allmusic review awarded the album 4½ stars stating "This is perhaps his fiercest, most exciting playing as a leader".

Track listing 
All compositions by Charles McPherson except as indicated
 "A Day in Rio - 10:42"
 "Come Sunday" (Duke Ellington) - 5:08
 "Chuck-A-Luck" - 4:48
 "Estrellita (Vito Picone, Arthur Venosa) - 6:19 
 "Si Si" (Charlie Parker) - 7:28
 "Free Bop" - 5:29

Personnel 
Charles McPherson - alto saxophone, tenor saxophone
Peter Sprague - guitar
Lou Levy - piano
Monty Budwig - bass
Chuck McPherson - drums
Kevin Jones - congas, percussion

References 

Charles McPherson (musician) albums
1979 albums
Xanadu Records albums
Albums produced by Don Schlitten